Brian Vear (16 November 1937 – 18 February 2008) was an Australian rower who competed at two Olympic Games.

He competed at the 1960 Rome Olympics in the men's coxless four and the 1964 Tokyo Olympics in the men's eights.

A member and later president of the Banks Rowing Club, he was twice a member of the King's Cup winning crew.

Notes

References

External links
Profile at Australian Olympic Committee

1937 births
2008 deaths
Australian male rowers
Olympic rowers of Australia
Rowers at the 1960 Summer Olympics
Rowers at the 1964 Summer Olympics
Sportspeople from Ballarat
20th-century Australian people